Orcustus is a Norwegian black metal band formed in 2002.

History
Orcustus formed in Bergen, Norway, in early 2002 by Taipan, Dirge Rep, Infernus and Tormentor. Their moniker, meaning "the inner circle of Hell where Lucifer resides on his throne", was suggested by Dirge Rep and the band got approval to use it from the name's rightful owner, Bård "Faust" Eithun, who published the underground fanzine Orcustus in the early 1990s.

Summer 2002 saw the band beginning to rehearse three tracks which eventually became the Demo 2002. These tracks were already written by Taipan for his former band Abattoir during the years 1998-2000. The demo was recorded in the autumn of 2002 and released early in 2003. The demo was quickly sold out, and garnered praise from well-known figures in the black metal scene, such as Fenriz of Darkthrone. This release led to a deal with the American label Southern Lord Recordings and later that year two tracks from the demo were released as the World Dirtnap 7” EP. Work for their debut album then began.

Teloch entered the band in 2004 and contributed with the track "Grin of Deceit" to the 2005 Wrathrash 7” EP. The title track hailed from the Abattoir days. A track called "I Satans virke" was also recorded in that session for a split 7” EP with the Norwegian band Daudur due for release on Worship Him Records in 2009. Teloch’s involvement with Orcustus came to an end in 2006.

After five years in the making, recording the Orcustus album commenced in spring 2007. Recording and mixing were completed in June 2008. By this time inner and outer adversity had taken its toll and the decision was made to end the band. However, in the last week of 2008, Dirge Rep and Taipan decided to pick up the pieces in order to resurrect Orcustus.

Members

Current
Dirge Rep - drums
Taipan - vocals, guitars, bass

Former
Infernus - bass
Tormentor - guitars
Teloch - guitars

Discography
Demo 2002 (demo) (2003)
World Dirtnap (7" vinyl EP) (2003)
Wrathrash (7" vinyl EP) (2005) (Southern Lord Recordings)
Orcustus (2009) (Southern Lord Recordings)

References

External links
Demo 2002 at Misantrof ANTIrecords
Southern Lord Recordings official website

Norwegian black metal musical groups
Southern Lord Records artists
Musical groups established in 2002
2002 establishments in Norway
Musical groups from Bergen